The Jiangxi International Women's Tennis Open is a tournament for professional female tennis players played on outdoor hard courts. The event is held at the Nanchang Tennis Center in Nanchang, Jiangxi province, China. It is also part of the China Open Series. The best performance of Chinese players in women's singles will receive a wild card from the China Open.

For the first two years, this was a WTA 125K series level tournament. However, beginning in 2016, it became one of the main WTA Tour level tournaments under the International classification.

Past finals

Singles

Doubles

External links 
 Jiangxi International Women's Tennis Open at wtatennis.com

 
WTA 125 tournaments
Hard court tennis tournaments
Tennis tournaments in China